Gubble, also known as Goober in select regions, is a Microsoft Windows and PlayStation game developed by Actual Entertainment (Eric Ginner, Mark Robichek and Franz Lanzinger). The non-violent gameplay was a key aspect mentioned in the game's promotional material. The game has a soundtrack of instrumental songs composed by Seppo Hurme (who also goes by Fleshbrain).

Most of the gameplay requires the player to solve a series of real-time puzzles in which they use tools, such as a hammer or screwdriver, which the main character, Gubble D. Gleep (an alien), uses in a humorous way to remove the implements of these tools, such as nails and screws, from the playing area.

The opening storyline to Gubble (only found in the instruction booklet) follows that space pirates have fastened zymbots (the game's levels) to the fictional planet Rennigar, with Gubble D. Gleep being sent on a mission by a robot to remove them.

Gubble was later re-released for iOS.

Gameplay
Gubble is composed of 10 cities (functioning as worlds); across these are various levels known as "Zymbots", which are usually maze-like in appearance. They are each filled with several enemies and tools. In the PC version of the game, each zymbot is named the same as that of the city plus an additional letter added to the end. For example, the game's first zymbot, which is in a city named "Rennigar", is called Rennigara, while the seventh is called Rennigarp. These zymbots may include bonus levels within them, such as minigames or "special zymbots", which are generally more difficult.

Tools
Tools are made to resemble those of a carpenter. A hammer, drill, screwdriver, socket, saw, and a sledgehammer are just a few of the tools used to deconstruct a level. Tools can be found within a zymbot and are used to remove the several nails, screws, hex nuts, etc., which hold a level together.

Legacy
Gubble 2 was released in 1998 for Windows 95 and Windows 98. With similar gameplay to the first Gubble game, Gubble 2 contains 124 levels (or zymbots), and features new tools and enemies. One notable difference is that in Gubble 2, Gubble walks around the mazes, instead of hovering. From 2000 the game was also playable in full, online at PlayMachine.net, using pay-per-play tokens (PlayMachine.net was an attempt to bring game arcades online). The game came with ZymEdit, a piece of software to edit, or make new, levels for the game. The game has another soundtrack of instrumental songs composed again by Seppo Hurme.

Gubble Buggy Racer was released in 2000. In the game, the player competes in buggy races across 8 different worlds (or tracks). The player can choose from Championship, Single Race or Time Trial modes as well as two player Head to Head or Deathmatch options. Unlike the non-violent gameplay of Gubble and Gubble 2, Gubble Buggy Racer contains a variety of super weapons to defeat the opponents. The game contains the same soundtrack as Gubble 2.

Gubble HD is an enhanced version of the original Gubble game that was released in 2007 on PC (as a 10th anniversary edition) and 2010 on the iPad. It contains new scoring, HD graphics, and three difficulty levels. At the same time as the iPad release, the original Gubble game was released on iOS.

On 28 September 2011, the original Gubble game was released on the PlayStation Store.

In 2012, Actual Entertainment started a Kickstarter campaign to raise funds for a game titled Gubble 3D. It raised $1,249 of the $80,000 aim.

In 2014, Actual Entertainment announced the upcoming release of their new Android endless runner game Gubble Vacation Rush.

In 2017, Lanzinger Studio (the new name of Actual Entertainment) started development on Gubble 20th Anniversary Edition.

As of 2020, Lanzinger Studio was developing a remaster of Gubble 2 for modern computers, supporting Windows 10, widescreen monitors, and not requiring a disc drive to play. Their website also mentions work into a remake of the original Gubble in the Unity engine.

SUPANOVA from the Gubble soundtrack is the theme music for Above It All (YouTube show).

See also
Crystal Castles (an arcade game with similar gameplay, also developed by Franz Lanzinger)
K.S.-n-Kickin (a game identical to Gubble 2, but with changed graphics and sound effects)

External links
Gubble
Gubble on IGN
Gubble on Gamespot
Mud Duck Productions a ZeniMax Media company
Gubble HD for the iPad
Twitter accounts of Gubble, Actual Entertainment and Franz Lanzinger
Gubble (PlayStation) can be played for free in the browser on the Internet Archive

References 

1997 video games
2002 video games
IOS games
Classic Mac OS games
Puzzle video games
PlayStation (console) games
PlayStation Network games
Video games developed in the United States
Windows games
Mud Duck Productions games